Frances Granger (born 1945) was a New Zealand netball player who played 12 times for her country in the Goal attack and Goal shooter positions. She went on to coach the game in places as diverse as Botswana, Fiji and Wales, as well as in New Zealand.

Early life
Frances Granger (née Rawstorm) was born on 17 December 1945. She went to school in Timaru in the South Canterbury region of the South Island of New Zealand. Her husband, Jack Granger, was a police detective. They had two children. Between 1965 and 1973 Granger represented Canterbury at the New Zealand Athletics Championships and won bronze medals in the discus and javelin. For this, and her netball achievements, she was made South Canterbury Sportsperson of the Year in 1972, the first woman to receive the award.

Playing career
Granger initially played netball for South Canterbury but transferred to Canterbury in 1973 following her husband's transfer to undertake training.  In Canterbury she moved from the Goal attack (GA) position to the Wing attack (WA), but returned to Goal attack when she moved back to South Canterbury. She made her debut as a member of the Silver Ferns, the New Zealand national netball team, against Singapore in October 1974, while en route to a tour of England, in which the team was undefeated. It was a new experience for her as the games were played indoors, whereas in New Zealand they were played outdoors. The following year, she was selected for the New Zealand team to play in the 1975 World Netball Championships, which were played in Auckland, New Zealand. Although that was the end of her national career, she played for South Canterbury and Canterbury over 16 years in total, winning several trophies and being selected on five occasions to play for the South Island against the North Island.

Coaching career
Granger coached the Canterbury Region team, the Canterbury Flames team, which competed in the National Bank Cup, and the Lincoln University team. Among other coaching appointments, she has taught at Rangi Ruru Girls' School and the Rangiora High School. In 2001 Granger coached the netball team of Fiji, in the year they won the South Pacific Mini Games. In 2003 she went to Wales to spend three months as the national team's shooting coach. In 2012 she spent three months as a volunteer coach in Botswana, following this with a period of seven months in 2014.

References

1945 births
Living people
New Zealand international netball players
1975 World Netball Championships players